993 Moultona, provisional designation , is a Koronian asteroid from the outer regions of the asteroid belt, approximately  in diameter. It was discovered on 12 January 1923, by astronomer George Van Biesbroeck at the Yerkes Observatory in Williams Bay, Wisconsin, in the United States. The likely elongated asteroid has a rotation period of 5.3 hours. It was named after American astronomer Forest Ray Moulton.

Orbit and classification 

Moultona is a core member of the Koronis family, a very large outer asteroid family with nearly co-planar ecliptical orbits. It orbits the Sun in the outer main-belt at a distance of 2.7–3.0 AU once every 4 years and 10 months (1,767 days; semi-major axis of 2.86 AU). Its orbit has an eccentricity of 0.05 and an inclination of 2° with respect to the ecliptic. The body's observation arc begins with a precovery taken at the Lowell Observatory in October 1931, more than 12 years after to its official discovery observation at Williams Bay.

Naming 

This minor planet was named after Forest Ray Moulton (1872–1952), an American astronomer and mathematician known for research in celestial mechanics. The official naming citation was mentioned in The Names of the Minor Planets by Paul Herget in 1955. The lunar crater Moulton was also named in his honor.

Physical characteristics 

Moultona is an assumed S-type asteroid.

Rotation period 

In December 2014, a rotational lightcurve of Moultona was obtained from photometric observations by French amateur astronomer Laurent Bernasconi. Lightcurve analysis gave a well-defined rotation period of  hours with a high brightness amplitude of 0.73 magnitude, indicative of a non-spherical, elongated shape

Diameter and albedo 

According to the surveys carried out by the Japanese Akari satellite and the NEOWISE mission of NASA's Wide-field Infrared Survey Explorer, Moultona measures between 12.43 and 15.15 kilometers in diameter and its surface has an albedo between 0.147 and 0.315. The Collaborative Asteroid Lightcurve Link assumes an albedo of 0.24 and calculates a diameter of 14.24 kilometers based on an absolute magnitude of 11.4.

References

External links 
 Asteroid Lightcurve Database (LCDB), query form (info )
 Dictionary of Minor Planet Names, Google books
 Asteroids and comets rotation curves, CdR – Observatoire de Genève, Raoul Behrend
 Discovery Circumstances: Numbered Minor Planets (1)-(5000) – Minor Planet Center
 
 

000993
Moultona
Named minor planets
19230112